Dagadi Chawl (Marathi: दगडी चाळ) (also known as Dagdi Chawl) is a 2015 Marathi language action drama thriller film directed by debutant Chandrakant Kanse. Presented by Manglmurti films and Produced by Sai Pooja Films & Entertainments. Daagdi Chaawl features an ensemble cast of Ankush Chaudhari, Makarand Deshpande and Pooja Sawant in lead roles. It is the third release for Ankush Chaudhari in 2015 after back to back blockbusters Classmates and Double Seat. Official teaser of the film was released with Tu Hi Re on 4 September 2015 and was published on YouTube on 5 September 2015 which met with very good response.

Official poster and trailer of the film was unveiled on 21 September 2015, which gains praises for dashing style of Ankush Chaudhari, his tempting chemistry with Pooja Sawant and look of Makarand Deshpande as 'daddy' which was kept as a secret for long period of time. Film was released on 2 October 2015.

The movie become instant hit for Ankush After the release of the film, fans poured milk on a big poster of the Ankush Chaudhari outside a Bharat mata cinema hall in Mumbai to show their love for him, a first time in history of Marathi Cinema that something of this sort has happened. It has been dubbed into Hindi as Daagdi Chaawl Ek Bagawat and will have its Marathi and Hindi world television premier on 12 June 2016 on Star Pravah  and STAR Gold respectively. The movie will be first Marathi film to premiere on STAR Gold UK on Saturday 16 July at 20:00.

Plot 
The movie is inspired from Mumbai's actual Dagdi Chawl which was known for gangster activities during 80's and 90's and was also the official residence of a gangster turned political leader Arun Gawli popularly known as 'Daddy'.

The film begins in 1996, when Mumbai was haunted by the continous gang-wars, happening between various criminals across the city. Surya aka Suryakant Shinde (Ankush Choudhary), who leads a peaceful life in one of the chawls of Mumbai is almost on verge to settle down in life by marrying his girlfriend Sonal (Pooja Sawant), meanwhile one incident happens with Surya which lands him in a situation where he has to come face to face with ‘Daddy’ (Makrand Deshpande) and his journey in underworld starts, his struggle to unassociate himself with the tag of Dagdi Chaawl lands him further deep into activities of Dagdi Chaawl and unwillingly becomes part of underworld, does he succeed to unassociate from Daagdi Chaawl or not forms the story of the movie.

Cast 
Ankush Choudhary as Surya
Makarand Deshpande as Daddy
Pooja Sawant as Sonal
Sanjay Khapre as Mama
Kamlesh Sawant as Inspector Kale
Yatin Karyekar as Daddy's Assistant aka Kala Coat
Sandeep Vasantrao Gaikwad as Mukesh
Gautam Berde as Desai Builder
Yogesh Markande as Informer

Soundtrack 

Music for this Action film is composed by Amitraj, while lyrics are penned by Mandar Cholkar and Kshitij Patwardhan. Makers of the film released first song 'Morya' a devotional track in the voice of Adarsh Shinde on 15 September on YouTube which became an instant hit. Second song 'Dhaga Dhaga' also become popular among music lovers by topping the music charts.

Track listing

Release 
Film is set for release on 2 October 2015 in theater's all over Maharashtra, Goa, Gujarat and in selected cities of Karnataka.

Reception
The film has received positive reviews. ABP Majha gave 4 out of 5 stars and declared movie 'Fast-paced crime action flick'. Pune Mirror gave 3 out of 5 stars and declared movie ' Well made, the film keeps you involved'. Maharashtra Times gave 3 out of 5 stars and declared movie 'As total entertainer'. Times of India gave 3 out of 5 stars.

Box office
Daagdi Chaawl collected  nett in first week and then equally impressive  nett in 2nd week. Film has total of  net in two weeks.

Sequel
In June 2022, Dagdi Chawl 2 was announced with teaser to release in theatres on 19 August 2022.

See also
Dagdi Chawl
Arun Gawli

References

External links
 
 
 

2015 films
2010s Marathi-language films
Indian action drama films